Speiredonia ibanorum is a species of moth of the family Erebidae first described by Alberto Zilli and Jeremy Daniel Holloway in 2005. It is found on Borneo.

The length of the forewings is 24.5 mm for males and 27.5 mm for females.

External links
 

Moths described in 2005
Speiredonia